Hockey Club Neman Grodno (HK Nioman Hrodna) is a professional ice hockey team from Grodno, Belarus that plays in the Belarusian Extraleague.

History

Team names
1980–1986 KSM Grodno
1986–1988 ShVSM Grodno
1988–1991 Progress Grodno
1991–present Neman Grodno

Winner 
Belarusian Extraleague (7):
  1998, 1999, 2001, 2013, 2014, 2017, 2018
  – 1993, 1994, 2011, 2012, 2019
  – 1995, 1996, 1997, 2000, 2002

Belarusian Cup (ice hockey) (3):
  2014, 2016, 2018
  – 2017

Eastern European Hockey League (1):
  1996
  – 1998, 1999, 2001

Continental Cup (1):  Winners ''' : 2014–15

Rosters

Team in the season 2018/19

Coaches

Season 2018/19

External links
Official website

Ice hockey teams in Belarus
Eastern European Hockey League teams
Belarusian Extraleague teams